Typha austro-orientalis is a plant species native to the southern part of European Russia. It grows in freshwater marshes. The type specimen was collected in 2000 near the City of Volgograd.

References

austro-orientalis
Freshwater plants
Flora of the Crimean Peninsula
Flora of South European Russia
Plants described in 2006